ORECA (Organisation Exploitation Compétition Automobiles) is a French racing team and race car constructor, founded in 1973 and run by Hugues de Chaunac, former team manager of F1 team AGS. Oreca has had success in many areas of motorsport. Since the early 1990s the team has concentrated on running sports cars and GT cars.

Team

In the 1970s and 1980s, drivers including Alain Prost, Jacques Laffite and Jean Alesi won the French Formula Three Championship for the team a record 11 times.

In the 1990s, Oreca ran a BMW operation in the French Supertouring Championship. It also won the FIA GT Championship and the Le Mans 24 Hours in the GT2 class with a Chrysler Viper GTS-R and overall for Mazda 787B in 1991, on their second attempt and first after a decade.

Also, the team prepared the Renault Clio S1600 for rallying and won the ice racing Andros Trophy with a Toyota Corolla driven by Alain Prost.

In the 2000s, Oreca assisted Renault Sport in building the new Mégane V6 for the Renault Eurocup Mégane Sport and fielding an Audi R8 in the 2005 Le Mans 24 Hours with support from Audi France. Also for 2006 Oreca ran the Saleen S7R in the Le Mans Series. The Oreca Saleen S7R had already won the 2006 Spa-Francorchamps Le Mans race.

Oreca worked closely with Dodge on the Dodge Viper Competition Coupe, producing well over 100 customer cars in the period 2006–2007 to GT3 specification.

Oreca entered a customer-specification Peugeot 908 HDi FAP with 'Semi-works' help for the 2010 Le Mans 24 Hours, as well as for the rest of the Le Mans Series races, taking overall honours at the Autódromo Internacional do Algarve and the overall championship ahead of the factory Peugeot teams.

In 2011, Oreca won the 12 Hours of Sebring race despite still using the Peugeot 908 Hdi-FAP, a model retired at the end of the previous season.

In 2012 Oreca was selected to run the Toyota TS030 Hybrid LMP1 car with support from Toyota Motorsport GmbH in the FIA World Endurance Championship (including the 24 Hours of Le Mans). The car showed promising speed but did not finish at Le Mans due to a large crash involving one car and mechanical problems sidelining the other.

Manufacturer 

On September 14, 2007, Oreca announced their plans to purchase sports prototype manufacturer Courage Compétition. Its first project was the Oreca 01, made for the LMP1 class. It was first raced at the 2009 1000 km of Spa with two entries.

During 2009, Oreca started producing the Formula Le Mans 'FLM09'. This was initially run in its own series named the Formula Le Mans Cup until 2010 when it was adapted to allow it to be run three other endurance series including the American Le Mans Series which gave the car its own category (LMPC). The idea was to give an affordable platform for smaller teams to get into endurance racing.

The Oreca 03 was launched to accommodate the new LMP2 regulations for 2011. In 2015, the Oreca 05 was unveiled, winning the LMP2 class at the 24 Hours of Le Mans.

Oreca was selected as one of the four 2017 LMP2 manufacturers, and launched the Oreca 07. A variation of the 07, the Acura ARX-05, was created for IMSA's WeatherTech SportsCar Championship Prototype class under the Daytona Prototype international (DPi) regulations, in partnership with Honda Performance Development.

Models

References

External links
 

French auto racing teams
French racecar constructors
1973 establishments in France
Auto racing teams established in 1973
24 Hours of Le Mans teams
European Le Mans Series teams
FIA GT Championship teams
FIA Sportscar Championship entrants
International Formula 3000 teams
World Touring Car Championship teams
French Formula 3 teams
German Formula 3 teams
American Le Mans Series teams
World Rally Championship teams